Littlest Pet Shop is a video game of the Littlest Pet Shop franchise for Microsoft Windows, Wii, and DSiWare. The game was released in North America on October 14, 2008. A second version was released on October 20, 2009, followed by a third version released on October 5, 2010.

Gameplay
Both Wii and DS gameplay revolves around collecting all the pets and amassing the largest. In-game elements cost Kibble Coins. Players can compete in a variety of games to earn Kibble. Besides buying pets and play sets, players can also enter a code to get a free giraffe, players can buy different accessories for their pets, ranging from hats to collars, to glasses in the salon, there is also an arcade where they can play minigames.

In Littlest Pet Shop Friends for the Nintendo Wii and Nintendo DS, the player tries to make a surprise party for an unknown pet.

In Littlest Pet Shop 3: Biggest Stars, released exclusively for the Nintendo DS, players attempt to make their pets the biggest stars in Biggest Stars Village. There are many activities such as hoops and dancing. Players can talk to the dog in the red ball next to Hero Hoops Arena to receive special LPSO codes.

Development
In August 2007, Electronic Arts gained the rights to some Hasbro brands, like Monopoly, Littlest Pet Shop, and Nerf. In February, EA Casual Entertainment announced that their EA Salt Lake Studio would develop and release Littlest Pet Shop and Nerf N-Strike.
In Fall 2008, the Littlest Pet Shop video game was released for Wii, Microsoft Windows, and Nintendo DS. For Nintendo DS, the game was initially released in three versions: Jungle, Garden and Winter, and fanciest including the Persian cat each with different pets. A fourth DS version, Spring, was released in March 2009. The Wii version has all the pets from the DS versions (excluding the Spring edition). The PC version is the same as the Wii except it is missing the regular minigames. The DS versions contained 20 pets and featured over 150 accessories for them.

Littlest Pet Shop Friends, a second edition of the game, was released in October 2009 for Wii and Nintendo DS. The Nintendo DS versions include: City Friends, Country Friends, and Beach Friends.

A DSiWare edition of Littlest Pet Shop was released in North America on December 14, 2009, and in the PAL regions on December 18, 2009. The cost is 800 Nintendo points. In late 2012, Gameloft released a Littlest Pet Shop game for iOS devices.

Littlest Pet Shop 3: Biggest Stars was released in October 2010 with three games that include two pets for people with a DSI or 3DS. They are Blue Stars Team with a horse and a poodle, Pink Hearts Team with a cocker spaniel and a mouse, and Purple Petals Team with a cat and a parrot.

References

External links

Official website

Littlest Pet Shop
2008 video games
DSiWare games
Electronic Arts games
Simulation video games
Video games based on Hasbro toys
Video games about animals
Virtual pet video games
Wii games
Windows games
Single-player video games
Video games developed in the United States